The 2009 New York City Marathon was the 40th running of the annual marathon race in New York City, United States, which took place on Sunday, November 1. The men's elite race was won by home athlete Meb Keflezighi in a time of 2:09:15 hours while the women's race was won by Ethiopia's Derartu Tulu in 2:28:52.

In the wheelchair races, America's Krige Schabort (1:35:58) and Switzerland's Edith Hunkeler (1:58:15) won the men's and women's divisions, respectively. In the handcycle race, Americans Dane Pilon (1:19:48) and Helene Hines (1:53:51) were the winners.

A total of 43,250 runners finished the race, 28,178 men and 15,072 women.

Results

Men

Women

 † Ran in mass race

Wheelchair men

Wheelchair women

Handcycle men

Handcycle women

References

Results
2009 New York Marathon Results. New York Road Runners. Retrieved 2020-05-13.
Men's results. Association of Road Racing Statisticians. Retrieved 2020-04-11.
Women's results. Association of Road Racing Statisticians. Retrieved 2020-04-11.

External links

New York Road Runners website

2009
New York City
Marathon
New York City Marathon